FYI (stylized as fyi,) was a Southeast Asian television channel (excluding Malaysia, formerly including Malaysia) dedicating to lifestyle. The channel was launched on May 27, 2008 as Bio. by A+E Networks Asia, a joint-venture between A+E Networks and Astro Holdings Sdn Bhd in Malaysia. On October 6, 2014, Bio. became FYI.

After 11 years of broadcasting, the channel ceased broadcasting on 1 July 2019, after which the channel space created in 2008 by The Biography Channel ceased to exist.

Final Programming

FYI Programs
Affairs Gone Wrong
Aftermath with William Shatner
Junkie Monastery
Hoarders 
Shipping Wars
Confessions: Animal Hoarding
Barter Kings
Private Chefs of Beverly Hills
Storage Wars
The Quon Dynasty
Billy The Exterminator
One Born Every Minute
Celebrity Close Calls
Celebrity Nightmares Decoded
Cursed
Monster In-Laws
Intervention
Celebrity Ghost Stories 
Storage Wars: Texas
Celebrity House Hunting
Airline USA
Way Of Broadway
Confessions: Animal Hoarding
I Don't Have Time For This
Hot, Famous and Forty
Big Fat Gypsy Weddings
Reno Vs Relocate
Shipping Wars
Sell This House
Paranormal State
Visionaries: Inside The Creative
My Little Terror
Under 21
Under 21 And Filthy Rich
Epic Meal Empire
World Food Championships
Tiny House Nation 
B.O.R.N. to Style
Rowhouse Showdown
Lost in Love
Best in Bridal
The Coolest Places on Earth

Bio Programs
BIO Classroom
Biography
My Ghost Story
My Ghost Story Asia
My Ghost Story: Caught On Camera
Hollywood
Cold Case Files
Panic 911
I Survived...
Ghostly Encounters
Big Fat Gypsy Weddings
Child Of Our Time
Gene Simmons Family Jewels

See also
 A+E Networks
 Crime & Investigation Network Asia
 History Asia
 FYI

Notes

References

External links
 

A&E Networks
Defunct television channels
Mass media in Southeast Asia
Television channels and stations established in 2008
English-language television stations
Television channels and stations disestablished in 2019